Ecca Vandal is a South African-born Sri Lankan-Australian singer-songwriter and rapper currently living in Melbourne. To date Ecca Vandal has released one self-titled studio album and one EP: End of Time.

Early life
Ecca was born in Louis Trichardt, South Africa to Sri Lankan Tamil refugees. When she was a child her parents chose to leave the country with Ecca and her older sisters in the late 1980s due to the Apartheid segregation. They moved to Australia and decided to settle in Melbourne. Vandal grew up listening to gospel music, and as Vandal recalled she "got into [her] sister's record collection, soul and hip hop and '90s RnB. And then [she] actually became obsessed with jazz music". She attended Victorian College of the Arts, studying for a Bachelor of Creative Arts in Jazz.

Music career

2013–2016: Early years
On 7 August 2014, Ecca Vandal released her debut single "White Flag" to positive reviews. A music video was released on 18 August. She later made her debut live performance at the Deathproof PR Christmas party in December.

On 19 February 2015, Ecca Vandal released her single "Battle Royal" alongside an accompanying music video. In July, Ecca Vandal signed onto Dew Process for Australia and New Zealand and Island Records for UK, later that week she played at Splendour in the Grass. On 17 August, Vandal released her single "Father Hu$$la", on 9 September the music video was released. Her singles "White Flag" and "Battle Royal" were later re-released on 1 September by Dew Process. On 2 November, Vandal released the single "End of Time", a music video later followed on 24 November.

On 29 January 2016, Ecca's debut EP End of Time was released by Dew Process, containing her two previous singles. On 30 March, a music video for the track "Truth to Trade" was released.

2017–2018: Self-titled debut album
On 17 May 2017, Ecca Vandal collaborated with Dan Cribb on the cover track "Happy Birthday, Lisa" from Cribb's album Worst Tribute Ever, containing covers of songs from The Simpsons. On 28 July, Ecca Vandal released her first single from her then-upcoming debut album, "Broke Days, Party Nights" alongside an accompanying music video. On 22 September "Future Heroine" was released alongside its music video. On 12 October she dropped the third single "Price of Living" featuring Dennis Lyxzén of Refused, Jason Aalon Butler of Letlive. On 20 October, Ecca Vandal released her debut self-titled album under the Dew Process label. Thomas Smith of NME gave the album a rating of 4-out-of-5 stars. From 3–25 November, Vandal performed a national tour for the album. Across Australia she performed her album in Fremantle, Adelaide, Newcastle, Sydney, Wollongong, Gold Coast, Coolum, Brisbane, Ballarat, and finished in her hometown of Melbourne. In December, she made her UK tour debut supporting Frank Carter & The Rattlesnakes performing in Bristol, Birmingham, Manchester, Glasgow, Nottingham, Norwich, London. She then returned home to perform at the 2017 Falls Music & Arts Festival in Lorne, Marion Bay, Byron Bay, and Fremantle again.

In February 2018, thieves stole thousands of dollars of Ecca Vandal's equipment. The gear included a six-string bass, a laptop, wireless transmitters, a keyboard, drum samplers, loads of guitar pedals and more. The singer took to Facebook  to get the word out about the crime and urged fans to come forth with information. A month later in March, she supported Incubus on their Australian East Coast tour. In April, Ecca Vandal covered Rihanna's track "Bitch Better Have My Money" for Triple J's Like a Version. She described her love for the song as "empowering" and how "[Rihanna] is a total boss in every aspect of her life." Three days later, Vandal released a music video for her track "Your Orbit" featuring Sampa the Great. In November, Ecca Vandal collaborated with Birdz on their track "Place of Dreams", for which Vandal was praised for her "creative elasticity, star power and sheer talent." Later that year, in December, Ecca Vandal joined the lineup for the inaugural Good Things Festival.

2019–present: Upcoming second studio album
On 10 January 2019, Ecca Vandal was confirmed to appear on Hilltop Hoods' new album The Great Expanse as a featured artist, it was later released in February. She appears on the tracks "Be Yourself" alongside feature artist Nyassa, and "Exit Sign" alongside feature artist Illy. "Exit Sign" debuted at #44 on the ARIA Singles Charts. On 15 May, Vandal was confirmed to appear at the 2019 Dark Mofo festival in Hobart, performing with Two People and Slag Queens. In June, Ecca Vandal received a monetary grant of $15,000 from the PPCA (Phonographic Performance Company of Australia) and Australia Council. Vandal stated she would use the grant to write and co-produce her second studio album. On 22 June, performing as a support act for Clowns on their Nature/Nurture album tour, Vandal unveiled a new song entitled "Stiff Middle Finger" which has yet to be officially released. On 10 July, Vandal was featured on "In My Mind" by Alice Ivy. On 10 December, Vandal was featured as the vocals for League of Legends new champion Rell's theme song.

On 21 February 2021, Ecca Vandal was featured on Void of Vision's re-imagined version of their single "Decay" from their 2019 album Hyperdaze.

Musical style
Ecca Vandal's musical style has been described as taking influences from artists such as Beastie Boys and M.I.A. Her track "Future Heroine" from her 2017 self-titled debut album, was described as being a blend of Gwen Stefani, M.I.A., and Kanye West's "Black Skinhead".

Discography

Studio albums

Extended plays

Singles

As lead artist

As featured artist

Other appearances

Music videos

Awards and nominations

National Live Music Awards
The National Live Music Awards (NLMAs) are a broad recognition of Australia's diverse live industry, celebrating the success of the Australian live scene. The awards commenced in 2016.

|-
| 2018
| Ecca Vandal
| Best Live Act of the Year - People's Choice
| 
|-

References

Australian women musicians
Australian women rappers
Australian people of Sri Lankan descent
South African emigrants to Australia
Dew Process artists
1980s births
Living people
Victorian College of the Arts alumni
South African people of Sri Lankan descent
Musicians from Victoria (Australia)
People from Melbourne
21st-century Australian musicians
Australian hip hop musicians
Sri Lankan Tamil people